Lawrence Davis Tyson (July 4, 1861August 24, 1929) was an American general, politician and textile manufacturer, operating primarily out of Knoxville, Tennessee, during the late 19th and early 20th centuries. As a brigadier general, he commanded the 59th Brigade of the 30th Division during World War I, and served as a Democratic United States Senator from Tennessee from 1925 until his death. Tyson helped organize the Knoxville Cotton Mills in the early 20th century and served as president of the second Appalachian Exposition in 1911.

A graduate of West Point, Tyson first saw military action during the Apache Wars in the 1880s. He moved to Knoxville in 1891 to teach military science at the University of Tennessee, and commanded the 6th Regiment, Tennessee Volunteer Infantry during the Spanish–American War. From 1902 to 1908, Tyson served in the Tennessee House of Representatives, and was Speaker of the House from 1903 to 1905. During the Hundred Days Offensive of World War I, the 59th Brigade, under Tyson's leadership, became one of the first Allied brigades to break through the Hindenburg Line.

Early life
Tyson was born on the farm of his parents, Richard Lawrence Tyson and Margaret Turnage, near Greenville in Pitt County, North Carolina near the Tar River in the Tidewater region. He graduated from the Greenville Academy, and initially worked as a clerk in Salisbury. In 1878, he scored the highest in his region on a competitive entrance exam for the United States Military Academy (USMA) at West Point, New York, and was admitted the following year. Upon graduation in 1883, Tyson was commissioned as a second lieutenant. Several of his fellow classmates would go on to become general officers in their careers, such as Charles W. Kennedy, George H. Cameron, Harry C. Hale, George W. Read, John W. Heard, Ira A. Haynes, Samson L. Faison, William C. Langfitt, Robert D. Walsh, Omar Bundy, Charles G. Morton, Tyree R. Rivers, John W. Ruckman, Isaac Littell and Clarence R. Edwards.

He later took part in the Apache Wars against a Geronimo-led faction of Apaches in the West.

In 1886, Tyson married Bettie Humes McGhee, the daughter of wealthy Knoxville railroad baron Charles McClung McGhee (1828–1907). With his father-in-law's help, Tyson was appointed professor of military science at the University of Tennessee in 1891.

He also enrolled in the university's law school, from which he graduated in 1894. After his admission to the Tennessee Bar, he resigned his military commission. He began practicing law. At one point, he worked for the law firm of Edward Terry Sanford (1865–1930), future Supreme Court justice.

Spanish–American War and business ventures
Upon the outbreak of the Spanish–American War in 1898, Tyson returned to active military duty. Appointed a colonel by President William McKinley, he organized and trained the 6th Regiment U.S. Volunteer Infantry in the Summer of 1898. In October, he and his unit were shipped to Puerto Rico, where they garrisoned the Arecibo area on the northern half of the island. As the war wound down in February 1899, Tyson's unit was ordered to Savannah, Georgia, where they were mustered out a month later. Tyson entered the National Guard reserve units.

Back in Knoxville, Tyson returned to private law practice. He organized the Knoxville Cotton Mills, which would grow to become one of Knoxville's major textile companies in the early 20th century. In 1907, he chaired a conference in Nashville, which called for reform in child labor practices across the South. In December 1910, several dozen children were still working at a Knoxville Cotton Mills factory, as shown in a photograph by National Child Labor Committee photographer Lewis Hine.

State politics
Tyson's first foray into politics came in 1902, when he was elected to the Tennessee House of Representatives. In 1889, the Democrats had gained control of the state legislature and quickly passed four acts which they described as "electoral reform," including literacy tests, grandfather clauses and poll taxes. These resulted in the disfranchisement of most of the African-American voters in the state, as well as many poor white voters. This sharply reduced competitive politics in the state, leading to Democratic dominance.

From 1903 to 1905, Tyson served as the elected Speaker of the House. Simultaneously, he served as a brigadier general and inspector general of the Tennessee National Guard, a position he held from 1902 to 1908. In 1913, he made an unsuccessful run for the U.S. Senate, seeking the Democratic nomination from the state legislature. That year, the Seventeenth Amendment to the United States Constitution was ratified, providing for popular election of US senators. It generally affected elections for US senators beginning in 1914.

World War I

Upon the American entry into World War I, in April 1917, Tyson applied to return to active military duty, and was appointed brigadier general over all Tennessee National Guard troops by Governor Tom C. Rye. This commission was subsequently federalized by President Woodrow Wilson. Tyson was assigned to the command of the 59th Brigade in succession to Brigadier General William S. Scott, part of the 30th "Old Hickory" Division, and helped train the brigade (composed of the 117th and 118th Infantry Regiments and the 114th Machine Gun Battalion) at Camp Sevier near Greenville, South Carolina. Tyson temporarily commanded the entire division three times during his service with the 30th: from December 22−28, 1917, from March 30 to April 7, 1918, and from January 12−15, 1919. After several more months of training, Tyson's brigade, together with rest of the division, embarked for service overseas on the Western Front in May 1918, and were among the first American troops to enter Belgium in July of that year.

In September 1918, the 30th Division, now commanded by Major General Edward M. Lewis and serving with the British Expeditionary Force (BEF), was ordered to the Somme area in northern France, and positioned opposite the heavily fortified Cambrai-Saint Quentin Canal section of the Hindenburg Line. On the morning of September 29, the 30th attacked German fortifications along this section of the line. Marching in dense fog, the troops pushed across a  stretch of "wire entanglements and trench defenses" before crossing the canal and securing the area. According to some reports, the 59th was the first Allied brigade to break through the Hindenburg Line.

In subsequent weeks, the 59th captured the northern French villages of Prémont, Brancourt, and Busigny, and fought its last action on October 20. In the course of the war, 1,879 of the 59th's 8,000 troops were killed or wounded. The brigade received nine Medals of Honor, the most of any single brigade of the U.S. Army during World War I, while Tyson himself was awarded the Army Distinguished Service Medal. The citation for the medal reads:

In October 1918, Tyson's son, Charles McGhee Tyson (1889–1918), a pilot in the United States Navy, was lost over the North Sea while scouting for mines. After Germany's surrender, Tyson left the front to help search for his son off the coast of Scotland. He located his son's body, and shipped it back to Knoxville for burial. Tyson left active duty for the final time in 1919.

Senate career

In 1920, Tyson made an unsuccessful effort to gain the vice presidential nomination at the Democratic National Convention.  In 1923, he purchased a newspaper, the Knoxville Sentinel. When he won the popular election to the U.S. Senate the following year, he sold the newspaper to Scripps-Howard. In 1926, Scripps-Howard merged the Sentinel with the Knoxville News to form the Knoxville News Sentinel.

In the early 1920s, the Democratic Party had grown frustrated with Senator John Knight Shields, who had opposed President Woodrow Wilson's League of Nations, and had stalled a number of the Executive Branch's political appointments. Sensing Shields' vulnerability, Tyson ran against and defeated Shields in the Senate Democratic primary in 1924. He defeated Republican candidate, Hugh B. Lindsay, in the general election later that year.  He was sworn in as a Senator on March 4, 1925.

Tyson's first major piece of legislation was the Tyson-Fitzgerald Act of 1925, which authorized federal compensation for disabled World War I officers. After President Calvin Coolidge vetoed the bill, Tyson rallied enough opposition in the Senate to override the president's veto.  In 1926, Tyson sponsored legislation authorizing the creation of the Great Smoky Mountains National Park.

Death and legacy
Tyson died, at the age of 68, in 1929 at a sanitarium in Strafford, Pennsylvania. He is buried in Old Gray Cemetery in Knoxville. The obelisk marking the Tyson family plot is among the tallest monuments in the cemetery.

In 1927, Lawrence and Bettie Tyson donated the land for what is now Tyson Park, as well as land for an airstrip (originally in West Knoxville), to the City of Knoxville, asking in return that the city name the airstrip for their son, Charles McGhee Tyson. McGhee Tyson Airport has since been moved to Blount County.

 Tyson Junior High School, which operated in Knoxville from 1935 until 1986, was named in Lawrence Tyson's honor.
 Camp Tyson, the World War II U.S. Army training post near Paris, Tennessee was named for him.
 Tyson's home on Volunteer Boulevard, which was remodeled by noted architect George Franklin Barber in 1907, is now used as the University of Tennessee's Tyson Alumni House.  In 2012, the house was listed on the National Register of Historic Places as the General Lawrence D. Tyson House.

In July 2007, Drew Gilpin Faust, a professor of history, college administrator and a great-granddaughter of Lawrence D. and Bettie Tyson, became Harvard University's 28th president. Her parents were McGhee Tyson and Catherine (Mellick) Gilpin. Her paternal grandmother was Isabella (Tyson) Gilpin, Lawrence and Bettie's daughter. Tyson is also a great-grandfather of actor Jack Gilpin and a great-great-grandfather of Jack's daughter, actress Betty Gilpin.

See also

List of United States Congress members who died in office (1900–49)

References

Notes

External links

 Lawrence D. Tyson: Philanthropist
  Retrieved on 2008-03-20

1861 births
1929 deaths
Democratic Party members of the Tennessee House of Representatives
American military personnel of the Spanish–American War
United States Military Academy alumni
Politicians from Knoxville, Tennessee
United States Army generals
University of Tennessee faculty
Military personnel from North Carolina
Burials in Tennessee
Democratic Party United States senators from Tennessee
Recipients of the Distinguished Service Cross (United States)
United States Army generals of World War I